Zabius is a genus of scorpion in the family Buthidae. There are three species described in this genus.

Species 
 Zabius birabeni Mello-Leitão, 1938
 Zabius fuscus Thorell, 1876
 Zabius gaucho Acosta, Candido, Buckup and Brescovit, 2007

References

Buthidae
Scorpion genera
Scorpions of South America
Arthropods of Argentina